Litter in Australia is prevalent in many areas and a significant environmental problem, particularly in the large cities of Sydney and Melbourne.

An anti-litter movement began in 1969 in Victoria with the formation of Keep Australia Beautiful.  Its major anti-littering campaigns "Do the right thing" and "Tidy Towns" became well known nationally.  Today, the most vocal organisation is Clean Up Australia which holds a national clean up day.

There is currently no national legislation against litter, because the federal government is not authorised by the Constitution to legislate on such a subject.

Legislation 
Legislation is generally considered the responsibility of either an States and territories of Australia (Environmental Protection Agency) or Local Government Areas.  All states and territories now have legislation against littering which may include fines that are enforceable by the police or other agents.  Some state environmental protection agencies do online litter reports.

Victoria 
In Victoria, the first legislation included the Environment Protection Act (1970) and later the Litter Act (1987).

The Environment Protection Authority (Victoria) was the first to facilitate report littering online (based on vehicle registration details) by introducing the appropriate legislation and dispense fines.

Northern Territory 
Northern Territory followed with the Litter Act (1972).

South Australia 
In South Australia the Container Deposit Legislation (1977) was introduced with the aim of reducing litter by encouraging recycling and remains the only state in Australia with this type of legislation.

Western Australia 
Anti-litter legislation was introduced to Western Australia through the Litter Act (1979).

Australian Capital Territory 
Litter legislation was introduced to the Australian Capital Territory with the Litter Regulations (1993).

Queensland 
In Queensland, litter laws first came into place through the Environmental Protection Act (1994).

New South Wales 
In New South Wales, legislation was introduced through the Protection of the Environment Operations Act 1997.

Tasmania 
In Tasmania, anti-litter legislation was introduced through the Litter Act (2007).

See also
Environmental issues in Australia
Container deposit legislation in Australia (container deposit legislation is an effective measure for reducing litter)

References

Environmental issues in Australia